Rodge Glass (born 17 January 1978 in Cheshire) is a British writer.

Biography
Glass was born in Cheshire, England. He attended an "an Orthodox Jewish Primary School, an 11+ All Boys Grammar School, a Co-Ed Private School, a Monk-sponsored Catholic College, [and] Hebrew University in Jerusalem." In 1997, Glass moved to Scotland to receive an undergraduate degree from Strathclyde University. For graduate school, he attended Glasgow University, where he was tutored by Alasdair Gray, James Kelman, Janice Galloway, and received a Master of Philosophy degree in Creative Writing. Between 2002 and 2005, Glass worked as a personal assistant to Alasdair Gray, which inspired his later biography of the writer. In 2008, he received a Doctor of Literature and Philosophy degree from the University of Glasgow.

Glass has worked as an editor for multiple publications and written for The Guardian, The Paris Review, The Herald, The Scotsman, and others. In 2013, he began working as a "Reader in Literary Fiction at Edge Hill University and Fiction Editor at Freight Books."

He is currently a Senior Lecturer in Creative Writing at the University of Strathclyde, where he also serves as the Convener of the Master of Letters program in Creative Writing.

Awards

Publications

As editor 

 The Year of Open Doors (Cargo, 2011)
 Second Lives: Tales From Two Cities with Jane Bernstein (Cargo, 2012)
 Articles of Faith by Michael Cannon (Freight, 2014)
 Head Land (Edge Hill University Press, 2016)
 The Storey's Story: Memories, Stories, Poems, Images

Biographies 
Alasdair Gray: A Secretary's Biography (2008)
Michel Faber: The Writer & His Work (Liverpool University Press, 2023)

Novels 
 No Fireworks (Faber & Faber, 2005)
 Hope for Newborns (Faber & Faber, 2008)
 Dougie's War with Dave Turbitt (Freight, 2010)

Short story collections 
 LoveSexTravelMusik: Stories for the EasyJet Generation (Freight, 2013)

Select short stories 

 "We're All Gonna Have the Blues," in Beacons: Stories for our Not So Distant Future, edited by Gregory Norminton (Oneworld, 2013)

References

External links
 Personal website

1978 births
Living people
Scottish writers
Scottish novelists
People from Cheshire
Scottish Jews
English Jews
University of Strathclyde
Hebrew University of Jerusalem alumni
University of Glasgow